The 1928 United States presidential election in Maine took place on November 6, 1928, as part of the 1928 United States presidential election which was held throughout all contemporary forty-eight states. Voters chose six representatives, or electors to the Electoral College, who voted for president and vice president. 

Maine voted for the Republican nominee, Secretary of Commerce Herbert Hoover of California, over the Democratic nominee, Governor Alfred E. Smith of New York. Hoover's running mate was Senate Majority Leader Charles Curtis of Kansas, while Smith ran with Senator Joseph Taylor Robinson of Arkansas.

Hoover won Maine by a margin of 37.67%, making Maine his third-strongest state after Kansas and Michigan.

Results

Results by county

See also
 United States presidential elections in Maine

References

Maine
1928
1928 Maine elections